Hartschiere (singular form: Hartschier) were predominantly members of the Bavarian residence guards before 1918, a historic military branch of the former 
Duchy and the later Electorate and at last Kingdom of Bavaria.

History 
According to Meyers Konversations-Lexikon, the Germanized word Hartschier originally derived from the Italian word arciere for archer, but it might also be possible that it has Spanish roots, because the Bavarian Duke William IV received a Spanish archer company of Charles I of Spain and added Bavarian court bodyguards with notable roots in the deep Middle Ages. On April 13, 1669, Ferdinand Maria transformed this unit to the Hartschier-Garde. The name of the former Austrian  equivalent, the k.k. Arcièren-Leibgarde, is similar-sounding.

The Bavarian palace guard troop, later called Königlich-Bayerische Leibgarde der Hartschier (L.G.H.), In addition to the Hartschiere, the kings of Bavaria had a royal house regiment from the end of the Napoleonic Wars until the fall of the kingdom after World War I, the so-called Infantry Lifeguards Regiment.

Entrance to this Guard was only possible for soldiers of impeccable character and conduct. The commander of the Hartschier troop had the title Generalkapitän (see also Captain General), associated with the highest class ranking in the Hofrangordnung (court order of precedence). He was appointed personally by the king.

In 1852 the Hartschiere got new uniforms with white supra vests over their jackets and helmets instead of the former caps, made of nickeled tin and gilded cast brass. The golden helmet plate showed the royal coats of arms and on top of the helmet was a standing golden lion figure. The helmet was worn with the lion for normal service, which was replaced by a white horsehair plume on full dress occasions. Older helmets had obviously two-headed eagle figures on top instead of the lion. The embroidered patch on the chest of the Hartschiere showed a large version of the Order of Saint Hubertus (Hubertusorden) with its motto "in trau vast" (means: be firm in fidelity). The Hartschiere were armed with épées and the halberd-like "couse".

On the occasion of the 200th anniversary a commemorative medal (2 Ducats) with a portrait of Ludwig II of Bavaria was given out in 1869.

Notable members 
 Maximilian Graf Seyssel d’Aix, Generalkapitän from 1837 to 1845
 Christian Frhr. von Zweibrücken, Generalkapitän
 Leonhard Frhr. von Hohenhausen, Generalkapitän after 1861
 Siegmund von Pranckh, Generalkapitän after 1876
 Maximilian Graf von Verri della Bosia, Generalkapitän
 Felix Graf von Bothmer, last Generalkapitän from 1909 to 1918

References 

Military units and formations of Bavaria
Royal guards